The women's +67 kg competition of the taekwondo events at the 2015 Pan American Games took place on July 22 at the Mississauga Sports Centre. The defending Pan American Games champion was Glenhis Hernández of Cuba.

Qualification

All athletes qualified through the qualification tournament held in March 2015 in Mexico, while host nation Canada was permitted to enter one athlete. Later an athlete from the Virgin Islands was given a wildcard to compete in the event.

Schedule
All times are Eastern Daylight Time (UTC-4).

Results

Main bracket
The final results were:

Repechage

References

Taekwondo at the 2015 Pan American Games
Pan